In mathematics, the secondary polynomials  associated with a sequence  of polynomials orthogonal with respect to a density  are defined by

 

To see that the functions  are indeed polynomials, consider the simple example of  Then,

See also

 Secondary measure

Polynomials